Camerunia flava is a moth of the family Eupterotidae first described by Per Olof Christopher Aurivillius in 1904. It is found in the Democratic Republic of the Congo, Malawi and Zambia.

References

Moths described in 1904
Janinae
Insects of the Democratic Republic of the Congo
Moths of Africa